Eacles adoxa is a moth in the family Saturniidae. It is found in Venezuela, Peru, Guyana, French Guiana, Ecuador, Colombia, Brazil and Bolivia. It is yellow with heavy red-orange speckling all over the wings. Orange eyespots are located in the center of each wing.

References

Ceratocampinae
Moths described in 1910